Horneburg is a Samtgemeinde ("collective municipality") in the district of Stade, in Lower Saxony, Germany. Its seat is in the village Horneburg.

The Samtgemeinde Horneburg consists of the following municipalities:
Agathenburg 
Bliedersdorf 
Dollern 
Horneburg
Nottensdorf

Samtgemeinden in Lower Saxony
Stade (district)